"Palisades Park" is a song written by Chuck Barris and recorded by Freddy Cannon.

Background
Barris wrote a song about an amusement park and it was suggested he use the name of an amusement park as the title.  One night he was in Manhattan when he looked toward the New Jersey Palisades Cliffs, on which the amusement park sat.  That was when inspiration hit and the title was added.  Years later the Palisades Amusement Park closed, on September 12, 1971.
A tribute to New Jersey's Palisades Amusement Park, it is an up-tempo rock and roll tune led by a distinctive organ part. The track also incorporates amusement park sound effects, including the sounds of screaming riders on the roller coasters, and the quoting of a slower version of "Entrance of the Gladiators", played on an organ imitating a hurdy-gurdy or calliope. In the song, the singer takes a walk after dark and discovers Palisades Park, where he meets and falls in love with a girl. Among the list of rides and attractions listed in the song are: Shoot the Chute, Rocket Ship, Roller Coaster, Loop the Loop, Merry Go Round, Tunnel of Love, and the Ferris Wheel.

Chart performance
Released by Swan Records as a B-side to "June, July and August," "Palisades Park" broke in when a Flint, Michigan radio DJ played it by mistake.  It peaked at #3 on the Billboard Hot 100 on 23–30 June 1962, On the Hot R&B Sides chart, the song went to #15. "Palisades Park" was the biggest hit of Cannon's career.

Cover versions
The song was covered as an album track by Shelley Fabares on her 1962 album The Things We Did Last Summer
Jan and Dean on their album Jan & Dean's Golden Hits in 1962. 
It was subsequently recorded by Gary Lewis and the Playboys in 1965 on their album A Session With Gary Lewis And the Playboys
The Beach Boys included on their 1976 on their album 15 Big Ones. Brian Wilson said of their rendition, "I looked at the guys, and they looked kinda sad. They didn't look happy; they looked like something was wrong. I said to myself, 'Hey maybe they're upset because we're not having any hit singles! Maybe they're mad at me!' I checked into it, and sure enough, as soon as we did 'Palisades,' everybody was happy again. Know what I mean?"
New York-based punk band The Ramones released their cover of Palisades Park on their 1989 album Brain Drain. It was also included on the Chrysalis Records 1991 release of their live album Loco Live, but was not on Loco Live's 1992 Sire Records re-release.
In addition, the song was performed live by The Stompers, a Boston-based band with members from Lynn, Massachusetts (Cannon's home town, although he was born in Swampscott, Massachusetts) beginning in the late 1970s. However, the group only recorded the track on a live album released in 1994.
New York City garage punk band The Devil Dogs included the song on its 1990 12"EP, Big Beef Bonanza.

Popular culture
 The song is excerpted in the Buchanan and Goodman novelty number "Ben Crazy" (1962, based on the Ben Casey TV show).
 The song was played over the public address system as the intro music each night for the Bruce Springsteen and The E Street Band Tunnel of Love Express Tour in 1988.
 In 1987, Cannon re-recorded the song, but as "Kennywood Park" (which, unlike Palisades Park before it, is still in operation), a reworking of the song about the Pittsburgh amusement park of the same name. It was issued as a limited edition 45 vinyl single distributed through National Record Mart as a fund-raiser for UPMC Children's Hospital of Pittsburgh Free Care Fund.
 Cannon also used a version of the song as a jingle for Boston's Oldies station WODS, Oldies 103, and South Florida's Oldies station WMXJ, Majic 102.7  in the '90s.
 More recently, "Palisades Park" appeared in the films Confessions of a Dangerous Mind (2002), depicting Barris' life; X-Men: First Class (2011), during a scene set in 1962, the year of the song's initial release; and on the soundtrack to the 2016 video game Mafia III.
 The song appeared on Family Guy season 21 episode 9 "Carny Knowledge".

References

1962 singles
Shelley Fabares songs
Gary Lewis & the Playboys songs
The Beach Boys songs
Ramones songs
Songs written by Chuck Barris
Swan Records singles
Jan and Dean songs
1962 songs